As the World Turns is an American television soap opera.

As the World Turns may also refer to:

As the World Turns (album), a 2018 album by Black Uhuru
"As the World Turns", a song from the album
"As the World Turns", a song from the 1981 The Sinceros album Pet Rock
"As the World Turns", a song from the 1999 Eminem album The Slim Shady LP

See also
 As the Earth Turns (disambiguation)